Staryi Ostropil, also known as Ostropil, is a selo on the Sluch River located in Khmelnytskyi Raion, Khmelnytskyi Oblast about 133 miles (222 km) WSW of Kyiv, Ukraine. It hosts the administration of Staryi Ostropil rural hromada, one of the hromadas of Ukraine. Staryi Ostropil is located at latitude 49°48' N, longitude 27°34' E and is situated at an altitude of 742.5 feet (225 m). The town of Lyubar is 11.1 miles (18.5 km) from Staryi Ostropil.

Ostropil was an important Jewish center in the 17th century and was mentioned in many contemporary texts including the birthplace of the noted Rabbi, Kabbalist and martyr Samson ben Pesah Ostropoli. Its Jewish population was wiped out along with that of Starokostiantyniv by the Nazis in 1942 before being liberated by the Red Army in 1945. The 5200 murdered Jews have since been commemorated at the Holocaust Memorial Park in Brooklyn, New York.

Until 18 July 2020, Staryi Ostropil belonged to Starokostiantyniv Raion. The raion was abolished in July 2020 as part of the administrative reform of Ukraine, which reduced the number of raions of Khmelnytskyi Oblast to three. The area of Starokostiantyniv Raion was merged into Khmelnytskyi Raion.

There are two cemeteries, one across the street from the other. Both are in a dilapidated condition.

Notable people
S. S. Koteliansky
Samson ben Pesah Ostropoli was born in Ostropil
The hero of Jewish humor, Hershele Ostropoler, was from that town
Grandparents of American filmmaker James Gray

References

External links
 OSTROPOL SITE Website devoted to the Jewish Community of Ostropol up to the mid 20th century.
 MAPS OF UKRAINE Click "Map covering area around Krasyliv and Starokostyantyniv".
 The murder of the Jews of Ostropol during World War II, at Yad Vashem website.

Urban-type settlements in Khmelnytskyi Raion
Volhynian Governorate
Historic Jewish communities in Ukraine
Cossack Hetmanate
Volhynian Voivodeship (1569–1795)
Novograd-Volynsky Uyezd
Shtetls
Holocaust locations in Ukraine